Orange High School (OHS) is a public high school located in Pepper Pike, Ohio, United States, an eastern suburb in the Greater Cleveland metropolitan area of Northeast Ohio. OHS is the only high school in the Orange City School District.

History
In 1924 the Orange Schools were consolidated from the individually operated Orange Township public schools. That year, the Foreman family donated the first  of property to ultimately comprise a  school district campus and the first Orange Schools building was opened on the current site of the high school. In 1973, the current Orange High School's contemporary structure was expanded upon, built around and opened on the site of the original school building. 

The Orange School District serves more than 2,200 students living in Hunting Valley, Moreland Hills, Orange Village, Pepper Pike, and Woodmere. Students living in portions of Bedford Heights, Solon and Warrensville Heights also attend Orange Schools.

State championships

 Boys' track and field – 1944 
 Girls' tennis - 2014
 Mock Trial - 2016
 Boys' tennis - 2021

References

External links
 Orange High School official website
 Orange City School District official website

1924 establishments in Ohio
Educational institutions established in 1924
High schools in Cuyahoga County, Ohio
Public high schools in Ohio